Muklawa is a 2019 Indian Punjabi-language, comedy-drama filmdirected by Simerjit Singh under the banner of Ammy Virk Productions. The film is produced by Gunbir Singh Sidhu and Manmord Sidhu. The film stars Ammy Virk, Sonam Bajwa, Gurpreet Ghuggi, Karamjit Anmol and B.N. Sharma are in leading roles with Gurpreet Bhangu, Sukhwinder Chahal, Rakhi Hundal, Drishtii Garewal and Sarabjit Cheema in are in supporting roles. Muklawa was released worldwide in cinemas on 24 May 2019.

Plot 
The whole film is based on the consequences of the old tradition of Punjabi culture after the wedding when a newly-wed bride is taken back to her husband's home for the first time to stay for 1 week.

Cast 

 Ammy Virk
 Sonam Bajwa
 Gurpreet Ghuggi
 Karamjit Anmol
 B.N. Sharma
 Gurpreet Bhangu
 Nirmal Rishi
 Sukhbir Singh Batth
 Sukhwinder Chahal
 Drishtii Garewal
 Sarabjit Cheema
 Rose Sardana
 Rakhi Hundal
 Tarsem Paul
 Anita Shabdeesh
 Sameer Pannu
 Sahib Singh Sandhu
 Parminder Gill

Production 
The film is Ammy Virk's home production where he launched his banner White Hill Studios along with Vikrant Studio. The whole movie was filmed in parts of Sri Ganganagar, Rajasthan, India.

Music 
The music of the film is composed by Gurmeet Singh and Mannat Noor, Happy Raikoti, Kamal Khan and Sukhy Maan are the playback singers.

Reception 
The film is includes in the list of high grossing Punjabi movies across the India, Pakistan, Australia, Canada, England and United States and have been done almost $474,162 revenue gross worldwide.

Awards 

The Muklawa blockbuster film received 1 best PTC Punjabi Film Awards as an best music and 2 times nominee of this award as best film and best director.

References

External links 
 

Punjabi-language Indian films
Indian comedy-drama films
2010s Punjabi-language films